Lessona is a surname. People with the surname include:

 Alessandro Lessona (1891–1991), Italian politician and academic
 Mario Lessona (1855–1911), Italian zoologist and malacologist
 Michele Lessona (1823–1894), Italian zoologist

See also
 Lessona (disambiguation)

Italian-language surnames